Tintern Abbey may refer to:

 Tintern Abbey, Wales
 Tintern Abbey, County Wexford, Ireland
 "Tintern Abbey" (poem), by William Wordsworth
 Tintern Abbey (band), a rock band in England in the 1960s